The women's 4 × 200 metre freestyle relay event at the 2014 Asian Games took place on 23 September 2014 at Munhak Park Tae-hwan Aquatics Center.

Schedule
All times are Korea Standard Time (UTC+09:00)

Records

Results

References

Final Results

External links
Official website

Swimming at the 2014 Asian Games